Gamphani Jones Lungu (born 19 September 1998) is a Zambian footballer who plays as a forward for SuperSport United F.C. and the Zambia national football team.

References

External links

1998 births
Living people
Sportspeople from Lusaka
Power Dynamos F.C. players
SuperSport United F.C. players
South African Premier Division players
Zambian footballers
Zambia international footballers
Zambian expatriate footballers
Expatriate soccer players in South Africa
Zambian expatriate sportspeople in South Africa
Association football forwards